Ruskaup House, also known as the Ruskaup-Niewoehner House, is a historic home located near Drake, Gasconade County, Missouri. The original section was built between about 1845 and 1850, with an addition made in 1860–1864, and summer kitchen about 1880. The vernacular German farmhouse is constructed of rubble stone.  Also on the property are the contributing rubble stone smokehouse, a log single pen cabin, and two log barns.

It was listed on the National Register of Historic Places in 1983.

References

Houses on the National Register of Historic Places in Missouri
Houses completed in 1845
Buildings and structures in Gasconade County, Missouri
National Register of Historic Places in Gasconade County, Missouri